The Real Academia de Medicina y Cirugía de Sevilla (The Royal Academy of Medicine and Surgery of Seville) was founded in 1693 as the Veneranda Tertulia Médica Hispalense (Venerable Spanish Medical Assembly) by a Sevillian physician named Juan Muñoz y Peralta.

The RAMSE is located in Seville(Spain), on 10-12 Abades Street with a geographic area of action that includes the provinces of Seville, Cordoba and Huelva. Its objectives are the promotion of health in terms of physical, psychological and social wellbeing, as well as, the contribution to expansion of knowledge of medical sciences in their different areas and specialties.

The RAMSE, has a library that has been enriched throughout more than three hundred years of its uninterrupted existence.  Currently it is keeping more than 13.000 books, of which 902 constitute the Old Collection. This collection contains works prior to 1826, made up of four incunabula books, eight post incunabula and many other rare or curious books, of which 568 are already digitized in full text to facilitate online consultation. RAMSE Old bibliographic collections

Associated with the RAMSE exists the Foundation-RAMSE, which has the function of facilitating the development of the Academy´s objectives acting as an interlocutor with its collaborators.

References

External links
RAMSE Official website.
Institute of Academies of Andalusia
Royal Academy of Medicine of Seville Foundation

1693 establishments in Spain
Medical schools in Spain
Organizations established in 1693